Carmo da Mata Biological Reserve was a state-level biological reserve in Minas Gerais, Brazil.

History

The reserve was created by decree with Law  nº 16.580 of 23 September 1974 and placed under the jurisdiction of the Instituto Estadual de Florestas (IEF). It covered  in the municipality of Carmo da Mata. An audit in 2012 stated that a number of biological reserves created in 1974 on state-owned land were being re-assessed, since they no longer qualified as conservation units. These were Carmo da Mata, Colônia 31 de Março and others. As of 2016 the reserve did not appear on the list of biological reserves in the state.

Notes

Sources

1974 establishments in Brazil
Biological reserves of Brazil
Protected areas of Minas Gerais
Protected areas established in 1974
Protected areas of the Atlantic Forest